Alan M. Parker (born 31 March 1939) is a British billionaire businessman.

Early life
Alan M. Parker was born into a family in Rhodesia (now Zimbabwe), the son of a British colonial civil servant.

Career
Parker trained as an accountant, and worked for the Hong Kong-based DFS Group. He became DFS's third largest shareholder, and in 1997 when it was taken over by LVMH, Parker received about $840m (£464m) for his 20% stake. Parker also made money investing in hedge funds and high technology.

As of 2014, Parker is living in Geneva, Switzerland and has a net worth of £2.34 billion.

Philanthropy
His wife Jette sponsors The Royal Opera's Jette Parker Young Artists Programme. In 1983 he founded the Oak Foundation, a philanthropic grant-making organisation.

Personal life
He is married to Jette Parker, and they have three children, Caroline, Natalie and Kristian.

References

1939 births
Living people
British billionaires